Eugeniusz Kapłaniak is a retired Polish slalom canoeist who competed from the late 1950s to the late 1960s. He won two medals in the folding K-1 team event at the ICF Canoe Slalom World Championships with a silver in 1963 and a bronze in 1961.

References

Polish male canoeists
1934 births
2008 deaths
Place of birth missing
Medalists at the ICF Canoe Slalom World Championships
20th-century Polish people